Spicer is a city in Kandiyohi County, Minnesota, United States situated on Green Lake.  The population was 1,167 at the 2010 census. Sibley State Park and many surrounding lakes are nearby.

History
Spicer was platted in 1886, and named for John M. Spicer, the original owner of the town site. A post office has been in operation at Spicer since 1886.

Geography
Minnesota State Highway 23 serves as a main route in the city, and U.S. Route 71 is nearby.

Demographics

2010 census
As of the census of 2010, there were 1,167 people, 520 households, and 312 families residing in the city. The racial makeup of the city was 98.2% White, 0.1% African American, 0.4% Native American, 0.2% Asian, 0.2% from other races, and 0.9% from two or more races. Hispanic or Latino of any race were 4.1% of the population.

There were 520 households, of which 27.3% had children under the age of 18 living with them, 47.7% were married couples living together, 9.6% had a female householder with no husband present, 2.7% had a male householder with no wife present, and 40.0% were non-families. 34.8% of all households were made up of individuals, and 15.7% had someone living alone who was 65 years of age or older. The average household size was 2.20 and the average family size was 2.85.

The median age in the city was 40.4 years. 22.7% of residents were under the age of 18; 7.1% were between the ages of 18 and 24; 25.3% were from 25 to 44; 26.1% were from 45 to 64; and 18.9% were 65 years of age or older. The gender makeup of the city was 48.8% male and 51.2% female.

2000 census
As of the census of 2000, there were 1,126 people residing in the city. The racial makeup of the city was 98.76% White, 0.18% African American, 0.18% Native American, 0.09% Asian, 0.36% from other races, and 0.44% from two or more races. Hispanic or Latino of any race were 0.71% of the population.

There were 528 households, out of which 26.1% had children under the age of 18 living with them, 46.8% were married couples living together, 8.5% had a female householder with no husband present, and 42.8% were non-families. 37.9% of all households were made up of individuals, and 21.0% had someone living alone who was 65 years of age or older.  The average household size was 2.13 and the average family size was 2.82.

In the city, the population was spread out, with 21.3% under the age of 18, 9.4% from 18 to 24, 26.1% from 25 to 44, 22.6% from 45 to 64, and 20.6% who were 65 years of age or older.  The median age was 41 years. For every 100 females, there were 92.2 males.  For every 100 females age 18 and over, there were 86.9 males.

The median income for a household in the city was $33,913, and the median income for a family was $48,542. Males had a median income of $36,477 versus $24,219 for females. The per capita income for the city was $21,103.  About 5.5% of families and 8.7% of the population were below the poverty line, including 6.8% of those under the age of 18 and 13.5% of those 65 and older.

References

External links
SpicerMN.com: Community and Visitor Information
ExploreSpicer.com: Official City of Spicer website

Cities in Kandiyohi County, Minnesota
Cities in Minnesota